Chisocheton setosus is a tree in the family Meliaceae. The specific epithet  is from the Latin meaning "with bristly hairs", referring to the fruits.

Description
The unripe fruits are pale yellow.

Distribution and habitat
Chisocheton setosus is endemic to Borneo. Its habitat is rain forest.

References

setosus
Endemic flora of Borneo
Trees of Borneo
Plants described in 1930